The Ahmet Hamdi Akseki Mosque is a mosque in Ankara, Turkey. The mosque is among the largest in Turkey.

History 
The foundations were laid in 2008 and construction of the mosque began in 2009.

The mosque was inaugurated on April 19, 2013, with a ceremony attended by then Prime Minister Recep Tayyip Erdoğan. It was named after Ahmet Hamdi Akseki, a religious scholar and former president of the Directorate of Religious Affairs.

Architecture 

The mosque consists of four minarets, each 66 m tall, and a dome with a diameter of 30 m.

Interior 
The mosque interior consists of traditional architectural elements. Contrary to what is generally seen, there is no chandelier.

References 

Mosques in Ankara